Nemea is an ancient site in the northeastern part of the Peloponnese, in Greece. Formerly part of the territory of Cleonae in ancient Argolis, it is today situated in the regional unit of Corinthia. The small village of Archaia Nemea (formerly known as "Iraklion") is immediately southwest of the archaeological site, while the new town of Nemea lies to the west.

Here, in Greek mythology, Heracles overcame the Nemean Lion, and here, during Antiquity, the Nemean Games were held (ending c. 235 BC) and were celebrated in the eleven Nemean odes of Pindar.

Myth, legend and history

In Greek mythology, Nemea was ruled by king Lycurgus and queen Eurydice. Nemea was famous in Greek myth as the home of the Nemean Lion, which was killed by the hero Heracles,  and as the place where the infant Opheltes, lying on a bed of parsley, was killed by a serpent while his nurse Hypsipyle fetched water for the Seven against Thebes on their way from Argos to Thebes. The Seven founded the Nemean Games in his memory, according to its aition, or founding myth, accounting for the crown of victory being made of parsley or the wild form of celery and for the black robes of the judges, interpreted as a sign of mourning. The Nemean Games were documented from 573 BC, or earlier, at the sanctuary of Zeus at Nemea.

At the temenos, the grave of Opheltes was surrounded by open-air altars and enclosed within a stone wall. The sanctuary's necessary spring was named Adrasteia: Pausanias wondered whether it had the name  because an "Adrastos" had "discovered" it, but Adrasteia, the "inescapable one", was a nurse of the infant Zeus in Crete. The tumulus nearby was credited as the burial mound of his father, and the men of Argos had the privilege of naming the priest of Nemean Zeus, Pausanias was informed when he visited in the late 2nd century CE. In his time the temple, which he noted was "worth seeing", stood in a grove of cypresses; its roof had fallen in and there was no cult image within the temple. Three limestone columns of the Temple of Nemean Zeus of about 330 BC have stood since their construction, and two more were reconstructed in 2002.  As of late 2007, four more are being re-erected. Three orders of architecture were employed at this temple, which stands at the end of the Classic period and presages this and other developments of Hellenistic architecture, such as the slenderness (a height of 6.34 column diameters) of the Doric columns of the exterior. The site around the temple has been excavated in annual campaigns since 1973: the great open-air altar, baths, and ancient accommodations for visitors have been unearthed. The temple stands on the site of an Archaic period temple, of which only a foundation wall is still visible. The stadion has recently been discovered. It is notable for its well-preserved vaulted entrance tunnel, dated to about 320 BC, with ancient graffiti on the walls.

The material discovered in the excavations is on display in an on-site museum constructed as a part of the University of California's excavations.

In 2018, archaeologists discovered  a large, intact tomb dating to the early Mycenaean era (1650–1400 B.C.).

The Battle of the Nemea River
In 394 BC the Battle of the Nemea River was fought between Sparta and her Achaian, Elean, Mantinean, and the Tegeate allies  against a coalition of Boeotians, Euboeans, Athenians, Corinthians, and Argives. This was to be the last clear-cut victory that Sparta enjoyed. The tactics were similar to all other Greek hoplite battles, except that when the armies were arrayed, with the Spartans having the customary honour of being on the right, the army drifted right as it advanced. This was not good for the Spartan allies, as it exposed the soldiers to a flanking attack, but it gave the Spartans the opportunity to use their superior coordination and discipline to roll up the flank of the Athenians, who were stationed opposite.

The result of the battle was a victory for Sparta, even though her allies on the left suffered significant losses. This willingness to accept losses on the left flank for flanking position on the right was a dramatic change from typical conservative hoplite military tactics.

See also 
 List of ancient Greek cities

References

Further reading

Carl Blegen, "The American Excavation at Nemea, Season of 1924", Art and Archaeology 9, 1925
B. H. Hill, The Temple of Zeus at Nemea (Princeton 1966)
Darice E. Birge, Lynn H. Kraynak, and Stephen G. Miller, Nemea I: Topographical and Architectural Studies: The Sacred Square, the Xenon, and the Bath (Berkeley and Los Angeles 1992)
Stephen G. Miller, Nemea II: The Early Hellenistic Stadium (Berkeley and Los Angeles 2001)
Stephen G. Miller, ed. Nemea: A Guide to the Site and the Museum (Berkeley and Los Angeles 1989)
Stephen G. Miller, Nemea: A Guide to the Site and the Museum, 2nd ed. (Athens 2004)
Robert C. Knapp and John D. Mac Isaac, Nemea III: The Coins (Berkeley and Los Angeles 2005)

External links

Nemea Center for Classical Archaeology page
Nemea Valley Archaeological Project, with pictures
Nemea. A Guide to the Site and Museum
Nemea, Naiad Nymph of the springs of the town of Nemea

 
Corinthia
Populated places in ancient Argolis
Ancient Greek sanctuaries in Greece
Ancient Greek archaeological sites in Peloponnese (region)
Former populated places in Greece
Locations in Greek mythology